The 1969–70 Rheinlandliga was the 18th season of the highest amateur class of the Rhineland Football Association under the name of 1. Amateurliga Rheinland. It was a predecessor of today's Rheinlandliga.

Results
Rhineland champion was last year's champion VfL Neuwied. SpVgg Bendorf took part as the representative for Rhineland in the 1970 German Soccer Amateur Championship and lost in the final round to representative from Saarland, FV Eppelborn.

VfL Trier, TuS Bad Marienberg and BSV Weißenthurm had to move down to the 2. Amateur League. Eintracht Trier II , FV Rübenach and Sportfreunde Eisbachtal came as newcomers from the 2. Amateur League for the following 1970–71 season.

References

1970 in association football
Football in Rhineland-Palatinate
1969 in association football